Perfect World is first studio album of American singer, Clint Crisher. It was recorded from 1997 to 1999. Only a limited run was printed, without the backing of a major label. To promote the release of the album Crisher performed an elaborate Halloween show for 1200 people during Millennium at the 9:30 Club in Washington, DC on October 31, 1998 opening with Big Boy. Perfect World was officially released June 15, 1999 with a performance on the main stage with the United States Capitol building in the background for the June 13, 1999 Capital Pride annual LGBT pride festival in Washington, D.C. with over 150,000 attendees.
The title track, Perfect World reached No. 7 on the TOP 100 MP3 in the United Kingdom. On September 30, Crisher performed One More Try live at the Stonewall Inn showcase presented by Xtreme Promotions and Music Plant Records during the Billboard Dance Music Summit 2002.

Track listing

References

External links
 Discogs page for Perfect World
 Clint Crisher– official web site.
 Clint Crisher portfolio at Crisher Entertainment.
 Perfect World by Clint Crisher- iTunes music

1999 debut albums